Koenig is an unincorporated community in Osage County, in the U.S. state of Missouri.

History
A post office called Koenig was established in 1892, and remained in operation until 1920. The community was named after early postmaster Henry G. King (King is "Koenig" in German).

References

Unincorporated communities in Missouri
Osage County, Missouri
Jefferson City metropolitan area